The 2018 Cheez-It Bowl was a college football bowl game played on December 26, 2018 at Chase Field in Phoenix, Arizona. It was one of the 2018–19 bowl games concluding the 2018 FBS football season. It was the 30th edition of a bowl game that has gone by various names, and was called the Cactus Bowl for its previous four playings. The bowl was sponsored by Cheez-It crackers.

Tied 7–7 at the end of regulation, it was the first 2018–19 bowl game to go into overtime; TCU defeated California in the first overtime period, 10–7. The two teams combined for six interceptions in the first half, more than any game during the 2018 season, with a total of nine for the entire game. It became the fourth bowl game in NCAA history with nine or more interceptions, joining the 1942 Orange Bowl, 1968 Sun Bowl, and 1982 Liberty Bowl. It is jokingly referred to on social media and by broadcast media as the “Cheez-Int Bowl”.

Teams
The game was played between the TCU Horned Frogs from the Big 12 Conference and the California Golden Bears from the Pac-12 Conference. This was the first meeting between the two programs.

TCU Horned Frogs

TCU received and accepted a bid to the Cheez-It Bowl on December 2. The Horned Frogs entered the bowl with a 6–6 record (4–5 in conference).

California Golden Bears

California received and accepted a bid to the Cheez-It Bowl on December 2. The Golden Bears entered the bowl with a 7–5 record (4–5 in conference).

Game summary

Scoring summary

Statistics

References

External links
 Box score at ESPN

Cheez-It Bowl
Guaranteed Rate Bowl
California Golden Bears football bowl games
TCU Horned Frogs football bowl games
2018 in sports in Arizona
December 2018 sports events in the United States
2010s in Phoenix, Arizona